Soichi Tanaka (田中 奏一, born June 27, 1989) is a Japanese football player.

Club statistics
Updated to end of 2018 season.

References

External links
Profile at Kagoshima United FC

1989 births
Living people
Keio University alumni
Association football people from Tokyo
Japanese footballers
J2 League players
J3 League players
Fagiano Okayama players
Kagoshima United FC players
Nara Club players
Association football midfielders